Francesco Tahiraj (born 21 September 1996) is an Albanian professional footballer who plays as a winger for Slovenian PrvaLiga club Radomlje.

Club career

Early career
Tahiraj started his youth career at CBS Milan academy based in Turin, Italy. At the age of 11, the former Juventus player Gianluca Pessotto spotted him and Tahiraj had a successfully trial with Juventus academy and in summer of 2006 he moved to Juventus.

In August 2013 he was loaned out for a year to Carpi for primavera team. On 16 July 2014 Juventus sold him to city rivals FC Torino for a fee of €75,000. In January 2015 Torino loaned him to Carpi primavera for a half season.

Zavrč
After spending several years in Italy as a youth player, in August 2015 Tahiraj signed a professional contract with Slovenian side NK Zavrč.

Tahiraj made his professional debut in the Slovenian PrvaLiga on 21 August 2015, replacing Veljko Batrović in the 83rd minute in a championship game against Domžale, which finished as a goalless draw.

Hajduk Split
On 12 January 2019, Tahiraj signed for Hajduk Split on a contract lasting until the summer of 2022.

International career

Albania U17
Tahiraj was invited for the first time to the Albanian under-17 team by the coach Džemal Mustedanagić to participate in the 2013 UEFA European Under-21 Championship qualifiers in October 2012. In the first two games of the qualification tournament he was an unused substitute. Tahiraj made his debut for the U17s side against Liechtenstein U17 on 23 October 2012, playing as a starter and also scoring a goal in the 39th minute in a 6–0 victory.

Albania U19
Tahiraj was called up to the Albanian under-19 team by the coach Altin Lala for the friendly match against Italy on 17 December 2014.

Career statistics

Club

Honours
Aluminij
Slovenian Cup runner-up: 2017–18

References

External links

1996 births
Living people
Footballers from Turin
Italian people of Albanian descent
Italian footballers
Albanian footballers
Association football wingers
Albania youth international footballers
NK Zavrč players
NK Aluminij players
HNK Hajduk Split players
NK Lokomotiva Zagreb players
NK Radomlje players
Slovenian PrvaLiga players
Croatian Football League players
Albanian expatriate footballers
Albanian expatriate sportspeople in Slovenia
Expatriate footballers in Slovenia
Albanian expatriate sportspeople in Croatia
Expatriate footballers in Croatia